De Boezemvriend  or Molen van De Groeve is a smock mill in De Groeve, Netherlands which has been restored to working order. It was built in 1871. The mill is listed as a Rijksmonument, number 41097.

History

De Boezemvriend was built in 1871 by millwright P Medendorp, of Zuidlaren, replacing an earlier mill. It drained the Zuidlaren Polder. The mill worked until 1934, when an electric motor was installed. The mill was derelict in 1960. The windshaft had dropped and the end of a sail resting on the ground. The mill was restored as a landmark over the winter of 1962-63 by millwright Medendorp of Zuidlaren, grandson of the original builder. It had formerly been equipped with Patent sails, but these were not restored. Further restoration to working order took place over the winter of 1989-90. The mill was officially reopened on 5 April 1990. The mill was named De Boezemvriend in 1991.

Description

De Boezemvriend is what the Dutch described as an achtkante grondzeiler - a smock mill without a stage. It has a single-storey brick base with a three-storey smock. The smock and cap are boarded, with vertical boards on the smock. The four Common sails are carried on a cast-iron windshaft which was made in 1894 by The Hague millwrights Prins van Oranje. The brakewheel has 59 cogs. It drives the wallower (27 cogs) at the top of the  upright shaft. At the bottom of the upright shaft the crown wheel (36 cogs) drives the Archimedes' screw via a gear with 35 cogs.

Public access

De Boezemvriend is open by appointment.

References

External links

Windmills in Drenthe
Smock mills in the Netherlands
Windmills completed in 1871
Rijksmonuments in Drenthe
Octagonal buildings in the Netherlands
De Boezemvriend, De Groeve